The Queen's English Society is a charity that aims to keep the English language safe from perceived declining standards. The president of the Queen's English Society is Bernard Lamb, a former reader in genetics at Imperial College.

In June 2012 the Society announced its closure because of declining participation, but it continued to exist, as volunteers filled the committee in September 2012.

History
The Queen's English Society was founded in 1972 by Joe Clifton, an Oxford graduate and schoolteacher. The Society's meetings were held in Arundel, and members wrote to newspapers and broadcasters, pointing out perceived linguistic errors and instances of ambiguous spoken English.

The Society claims to be concerned about the education of children. It believes that teachers should be trained to spot certain errors in English usage. In 1988, the Society delivered a petition to the then Secretary of State for Education and Science, Kenneth Baker, urging him "to introduce the compulsory study of formal grammar, including parsing and sentence analysis, into the school curriculum".

The objectives of the Society, as expressed in its constitution, are "to promote the maintenance, knowledge, understanding, development and appreciation of the English language as used both colloquially and in literature; to educate the public in its correct and elegant usage; and to discourage the intrusion of anything detrimental to clarity or euphony”.

On 4 June 2012, after a general meeting of the society attracted no nominations to replace retiring officers of the Society, chairman Rhea Williams announced that the society would cease to exist, but after new committee members volunteered, the Society was able to continue.

The QES Academy of the English Language

In June 2010 the QES announced that it had formed an Academy of English, a language reference website. The founder of the academy was quoted as saying that: "At the moment, anything goes. Let’s set down a clear standard of what is good, correct, proper English. Let’s have a body to sit in judgment."

Reception
A Daily Telegraph opinion piece had called the QES Academy "both welcome and long overdue. [...] English has been left to fend for itself at a time when it is under unprecedented attack." The Guardian believed that the Academy would seek to "protect the language from innovations", although its members had insisted that it would "mov[e] with the times".

American phoneticist Mark Liberman called the QES "even more illogical, hypocritical and badly informed than you'd expect them to be". In the Baltimore Sun John E McIntyre wrote: "the peevish combination of shibboleth and superstition about language, combined with a sad, sad little snobbery about their presumed mastery of the language, renders these people [the QES] impervious to reason", referencing an analysis of their nascent website by Stan Carey. Comedian David Mitchell disliked the "self-appointed" nature of the Academy and asked, "[b]y what authority would they sit in judgment?" The proposal was received with scepticism by The Economist'''s Lane Greene.

Publications
The Society's quarterly journal, Quest, has been sent to members from 1979. It included articles, letters from members, news, book reviews, puzzles and poems. Books published by the QES include The Queen's English: And How to Use It by Bernard Lamb, and Shakin' the Ketchup Bot'le, a compilation of articles from Quest''.

See also
 Linguistic prescription
 Received Pronunciation

References

External links
 Queen's English Society homepage
 Charity Commission page for the Queen's English Society

English language
Educational organisations based in the United Kingdom
English
English
1972 establishments in the United Kingdom
Organizations established in 1972